Brigitte Gonthier-Maurin (born 23 April 1956) is a member of the Senate of France, representing the Hauts-de-Seine department.  She is a member of the Communist, Republican, and Citizen Group.

References
Page on the Senate website

1956 births
Living people
French Senators of the Fifth Republic
Women members of the Senate (France)
21st-century French women politicians
Senators of Hauts-de-Seine
Place of birth missing (living people)